Anthony Rodriguez (born 4 November 1979 in Orléans) is a French judoka.

Achievements

References

External links
 
 

 Videos on Judovision.org

1979 births
Living people
Sportspeople from Orléans
French male judoka
Judoka at the 2008 Summer Olympics
Olympic judoka of France
21st-century French people